Raj Kumar Talwar (1922–2002) was an Indian business executive. He served as chairman of State Bank of India who was sacked by the Indira Gandhi government in the emergency in 1976 for refusing to grant loans to people favoured by the government. As no provision in the SBI Act allowed them to terminate the chairman, the Act had was amended to sack him.

Early life 
He was born in 1922. He earned an M.A. degree in Mathematics from Lahore University.

Career 
He joined the Imperial Bank of India at Lahore in November 1943 as probationary assistant. At the bank he served as Superintendent of Branches and Superintendent of Advances in the Bengal Circle and Inspector of Branches under Central Office. 

In 1961, he was appointed Deputy Secretary and Treasurer in the Bengal Circle. A year later, he moved to the Madras Circle in the same capacity. 

He became the first Secretary and Treasurer of the Hyderabad Circle when it was created in 1965. In January 1966, Talwar was appointed as Secretary and Treasurer of the Bombay Circle. 

On 1 February 1968 he was appointed as one of the banks' two Managing Directors, becoming the youngest to achieve that office. 

He initiated the approach of employing professional bankers as bank chiefs when he became Chairman on 1 March 1969. He was the youngest Chairman ever.

He expanded the Bank's business by extending its reach, and led initiatives in the areas of innovative banking, rehabilitation of sick industries, credit plans for rural development, etc. He ensured simplification of procedures for financing small-scale industries and launched schemes for the benefit of smaller enterprises and agriculture. He installed systems to ensure proper end-use of bank funds besides comprehensive analysis of corporate balance sheet long before the Reserve Bank of India prescribed norms for credit analysis. 

He initiated the first ever restructuring of the Bank in 1971, which held for over three decades.

Legacy 
Talwar was known for his values, integrity, dynamism and professionalism. He left the Bank on 3 August 1976, at age 54.Settling in Pondicherry, he served on boards of companies and headed the Industrial Development Bank of India in the late 1970s. He lived a spartan life and traveled around Pondicherry on a bicycle. He died on 23 April 2002. Talwar's name is linked with the issue of customer service.

References

Indian bankers
Chairmen of the State Bank of India
1912 births
2002 deaths